Sir Arthur Mielziner Myers (19 May 1868 – 9 October 1926) was a New Zealand politician. He was Mayor of Auckland City from 1905 to 1909, Member of the House of Representatives from 1910 to 1921, and a Cabinet Minister. Today he is remembered mainly for the public works constructed in Auckland during his term as Mayor, and partly from his donations, including Grafton Bridge and Myers Park.

Early life
Myers was born in Ballarat, Victoria, Australia, the child of Louis Myers and Catherine Ehrenfried. Following the death of his father in 1870, his mother moved to Wellington, New Zealand. Myers went to Wellington College from 1880 to 1883. His main sporting interests were rowing and swimming. The family moved to Auckland in 1886, where his uncle, Louis Ehrenfried had moved the family brewing business from Thames. Later, in 1897, the successful brewery was combined with that of Logan Campbell to form Campbell and Ehrenfried. An able administrator and already something of a financial wizard at the age of 30, Myers became Managing Director of the merged company following the death of his uncle in 1897.

In 1903 Myers journeyed to London to marry Vera Anita Levy who he had met two years before. She was the daughter of Benjamin Levy, one of the owners of a large British business empire with interests in Australia. Married in London, they returned to New Zealand, where his wife became a well-known hostess and patron of the local cultural scene. It was she who encouraged Myers to eventually run for public office.

Public life

Myers ran for and succeeded in becoming Mayor of Auckland City for the term 1905 to 1909. He improved the finances of the city administration, improved services such as the water supply and drainage. The construction of the new Auckland Town Hall was largely due to his efforts, as was the new Grafton Bridge across Grafton Gully. Myers Park, located between Karangahape Road and Mayoral Drive, is named after him, as in 1913 he donated £10,000 to develop the previously overgrown gully into a child-friendly park and to build the adjacent 'Myers Free Kindergarten' (still operating in the same heritage building). One of his few major failures was an unsuccessful attempt to reduce the plethora of local Councils then governing the Auckland isthmus. Nevertheless, he had become known as a popular and effective politician.

Active in the volunteer defence movement, he served as major in the 1st Battalion Auckland Infantry Volunteers and as commanding officer, with the rank of lieutenant colonel, of the New Zealand Forces Motor Service Corps.

Myers donated the Myers cup to the new Auckland Rugby League in 1910. It was contested as the top prize in the inaugural 1910 season and again in 1911. In 1914 Myers was elected the Auckland Rugby League president and he served in this role until his death in 1926.

He was an Independent initially, and from 1911 he stood for the Liberal Party.

In the short-lived Mackenzie Ministry of 28 March to 10 July 1912 he held three important portfolios; Finance, Defence, Railways, also the Tax Department. From 12 August 1915 to 25 August 1919 he served as Minister of Customs and Minister in charge of Munitions and Supplies, Pensions, Advertising and National Provident Fund during the wartime National (coalition) Ministry, where the gained much acclaim for his efficiency and impartiality. In the 1924 New Year Honours, he was appointed a Knight Bachelor, in recognition of his public services.

Deciding to leave politics—as he had no wish for a long period of opposition for his party—he left politics in 1921, and also left New Zealand, as he had promised his wife at the time of their wedding that they would eventually return to London where she had grown up. The departure was seen a great loss by many locals. Active for the National Bank of New Zealand, he otherwise led a semi-retired life and took up golf. He died in London in 1926 to the effects of a series of heart attacks. He was survived by his children and his wife Vera. His son, Ken Myers, took over the company. A grandson, Douglas Myers, became CEO of Campbell and Ehrenfried in 1965 and later created Lion Nathan.

References

|-

1868 births
1926 deaths
Jewish mayors
New Zealand Knights Bachelor
People educated at Wellington College (New Zealand)
Mayors of Auckland
Members of the Cabinet of New Zealand
New Zealand defence ministers
New Zealand finance ministers
Jewish New Zealand politicians
New Zealand Liberal Party MPs
Australian emigrants to New Zealand
Australian Jews
New Zealand rugby league administrators
Members of the New Zealand House of Representatives
New Zealand MPs for Auckland electorates
People from Ballarat
New Zealand politicians awarded knighthoods